Cangas del Narcea is one of 54 parishes in Cangas del Narcea, a municipality within the province and autonomous community of Asturias, in northern Spain. 

It is also the municipal capital.

Parishes in Cangas del Narcea